Ali Ahmadifar (born 12 July 1976) is an Iranian composer, teacher and researcher.

Book
 Author of the book "Stylistics of Arvo Pärt music (Persian:سبک شناسی موسیقی آروو پارت)", published 2007.

Works
 "Where are you, o thou fairy?"(An Iranian variation) was performed by MDR Leipzig Radio Symphony Orchestra in 2006.
 one of his works was performed by valid flute soloist Reza Najfar in 2008, Rasht.
 "Minimove" (An Iranian variation for flute and strings) was performed by Camerata symphony orchestra led by Keyvan Mirhadi in 2008, Rasht.
 "Bâng – e Robâb" was performed by the Avram ensemble in 2011.
 Radio contemporary music program editor and writer in Iranian radio broadcast network culture, 1999-2000.
 The founder and first conductor of Gilan sinfonietta orchestra and choir, performing concert at Vahdat Hall, September 2007.

Lectures
 Concepts and specification of Music
 International Customary instruments and symphony orchestra
 Composition
 Orchestration
 Variation
 Canon and Fugue
 Sonata
 Form
 Symphony from the beginning until today
 Opera from the beginning until today
 Concerto from the beginning until today
 Chamber music from the beginning until today
 The impact of Liturgical music in the classical music
 Modernism in music
 Postmodernism in Music
 Minimalism, Post Minimalism and After 
 Aleatory Music
 Musical Terms 
 Nonserial Atonality Music 
 Neo Romanticism 
 Classical Serialism and Total Serialism 
 Analysis of Bach's Chromatic Fantasia and Fugue 
 Steve Reich
 Philip Glass
 Arvo Pärt
 Contemporary music
 Iranian composers
 Pathology of Iranian today music
 Dynamics and Rest
 Pluralism in post-tonal music
 Modern and contemporary harmony
 Stylistics and history of contemporary music
 The Development of rhythm
 The end of historic music and new history of music
 Authoring and translating professional articles about the contemporary music of world and Iran
 Head of Gilan music community organization, 2007-2011 
 lecturer of University of Applied Sciences & Technology (UAST), Art and Culture Gillan branch, years 2009-2010.
 lecturer of music Faculty, Gilan University, 2011-2012.
 Jury member of Eleventh music festival of Khuzestan, Ahvaz February 2012.
 Teaching composition, stylistics and history of music in Tehran, Rasht and Ahvaz

References

1976 births
Iranian composers
Contemporary classical composers
21st-century classical composers
Iranian musicologists
Living people